Clément Lépidis (1920–1997) was a French novelist of Greek descent. He was born Kleanthis Tsélébidis into a Greek Orthodox family that had settled in Paris, having fled the massacre of the Greek population in Anatolia carried out by the Young Turks during the Greek-Turkish war.

Lépidis spent his childhood and adolescence in the Parisian neighbourhood of Belleville. His father, like many Greek and Armenian refugees, worked in the shoe trade, which Clément too tried at one point as he later related in his books such as Ma vie en chantier, L'Arménien and La Main rouge. He tried several other careers, e.g., stockbroker's clerk, photographer, radio wireman, sales representative, cashier. His work experiences inspired the book The Tribulations of a Commercial Traveller. Afterwards, he devoted himself to painting and literature.

Among his friends were the photographer Robert Doisneau, the accordionist Jo Privat whose biography he wrote, and the wrestler Tasso Miades. Lépidis loved his fellow Parisians. He described their happy and friendly character, but also wrote of the dark side of Paris during the German occupation when many Jews and Armenians, his friends and neighbours from Belleville were rounded up. These he depicted in the novel The Armenian.

At his death in 1997, he left behind many works of literature, including poetry, short stories, and novels. His work was rooted in both the Mediterranean and his own Belleville neighbourhood.

Awards
 La Rose de Büyükada (1963) – winner of the Prix des Deux Magots
 Le Marin de Lesbos (1972) – winner of the Prix du roman populiste

References 

French people of Greek descent
1920 births
1997 deaths
Writers from Paris
Grand Prix du roman de l'Académie française winners
Prix des Deux Magots winners
20th-century French novelists
French male novelists
20th-century French male writers